Gymnoscelis concinna is a moth in the family Geometridae first described by Charles Swinhoe in 1902. It is found on various Pacific islands, including Tonga, Fiji and the Cook Islands, the Austral Islands, Easter Island, Henderson Island, Pitcairn Island and the Society Islands.

Subspecies
Gymnoscelis concinna concinna (Tonga)
Gymnoscelis concinna nephelota Prout, 1958 (Fiji)
Gymnoscelis concinna solmafua Robinson, 1975 (Rotuma Island)

References

Moths described in 1902
concinna